Ahaetulla laudankia, known as the Laudankia vine snake, is a species of snake in the family Colubridae. It is endemic to India and while being a rare species, it has a relatively large range, extending from the Eastern Ghats through Central India west to eastern Rajasthan. Its name derives from the Odia term laudanka, which translates to "dried stems of bottle gourd, as the snake closely resembles them with its thin body and brownish color.

References 

laudankia
Reptiles of India
Endemic fauna of India
Reptiles described in 2019
Taxa named by Veerappan Deepak